Love Twist is a South Korean television series starring Hahm Eun-jung, Kim Jin-yeop and Son Seong-yoon. The series, directed by Kim Won-yong  and written by Lee Eun-joo, tells the story of a family whose love and life are totally twisted because of a lie. The daily drama premiered on KBS2 on December 13, 2021 and aired on every weekday at 19:50 (KST) till May 20, 2022.

Synopsis
Love Twist is a story of three families, giving insight into the meaning of family and love.

Cast and characters

Main
 Hahm Eun-jung as Oh So-ri, the CEO of the online shopping mall 'Kkwabaegi'
 Kim Jin-yeop as Park Ha-ru, a warm and friendly tsundere style
 Hwang Shin-hye as Park Hee-ok, the best friend of Maeng Ok-hee
 Yoon Da-hoon as Oh Gwang-nam, 39-year-old, Ok-hee's husband, CEO of Dongbang Group
 Shim Hye-jin as Maeng Ok-hee, 35 years old, Oh Gwang-nam's wife
 Son Seong-yoon as Kang Yoon-ah, a high school classmate of So-ri and a persistent love affair with Park Ha-ru
 Jang Se-hyeon as Jo Kyung-joon, a man who is jobless

Supporting

 Park Hye-jin as Kim Soon-bun, Oh Gwang-nam's mother and So-ri's grandmother
 Yoo Tae-woong as Jang Dong-man, husband of 'Mi-ja' and longtime friend of 'Gwang-nam'.
 Oh Young-shil as Hwang Mi-ja, Kyung-joon's mother
 Kim Ju-ri as Shin Do-hee, she was working as a nursing assistant in the VIP ward of a university hospital
 Lee Su-yong as Kim Chul-gu, Ha-ru's high school senior
 Lee Dal-hyung as Gangnam Chun, Yoona's father, farmer
 Park Chul-ho as Park Ki-tae, fraud, violence, theft, rape...., ex-convict
 Kim Sung-kyum
 Nam Kyung-eup
 Na Young-hee
 Yoon In-jo

Production
Director Kin Won-yong and writer Lee Eun-joo are working together in the 6th series. They worked in dramas: The Return of Simcheon, KBS2 TV 2009 morning daily drama I'll Give You Everything, KBS2 2013 series Samsaengi, KBS1 TV 2014 daily drama My Dear Cat, and KBS2 TV 2019 daily drama A Place in the Sun. On September 29, Hahm Eun-jung agency Management Gu informed that she has received offer to appear in the series. Shim Hye-jin is appearing in a KBS drama after a hiatus of 3 years, she last appeared in  KBS1 TV daily series Sunny Again Tomorrow. Son Seong-yoon confirmed to join the cast of series in October.
 Script reading site was revealed on November 11, with release of photos.

Release
The series was released on December 13, 2021 on KBS2.

Original soundtrack

Part 1

Part 2

Part 3

Part 4

Part 5

Part 6

Part 7

Part 8

Part 9

Part 10

Part 11

Part 12

Part 13

Part 14

Part 15

Part 16

Part 17

Part 18

Part 19

Part 20

Part 21

Part 22

Viewership 
 Audience response

Awards & nominations

International broadcast

Notes

References

External links
  
 Love Twist at Daum 
  Love Twist at Naver 
 
 

Korean Broadcasting System television dramas
2021 South Korean television series debuts
2022 South Korean television series endings
Korean-language television shows
Television series about families
South Korean melodrama television series
South Korean comedy television series